Laddawan Srisakorn (born ) is a retired Thai female volleyball player.

She was part of the Thailand women's national volleyball team at the 1998 FIVB Volleyball Women's World Championship in Japan.

References

1975 births
Living people
Laddawan Srisakorn
Place of birth missing (living people)
Laddawan Srisakorn
Laddawan Srisakorn